Claud No. 1 Archeological Site is an archaeological site located at Groveland in Livingston County, New York.

It was listed on the National Register of Historic Places in 1975.

References

Geography of Livingston County, New York
Archaeological sites on the National Register of Historic Places in New York (state)
National Register of Historic Places in Livingston County, New York